"Piano Man" is a song written and performed by American singer-songwriter Billy Joel. As his first single in North America, it was included on Joel's 1973 album of the same name and later released as a single on November 2, 1973. The song is sung from Joel's point of view as a piano player at a bar, reminiscing about his experiences there and the people he encountered. "Piano Man" is based on Joel's real-life experiences as a lounge musician in Los Angeles from 1972 to 1973, which he had decided to pursue in an effort to escape his contracted New York City-based record company at the time, Family Productions, following the poor commercial performance of the album Cold Spring Harbor. Joel describes various characters, including a bartender named John and a "real estate novelist" named Paul, all based on real-life individuals.

Joel's first major hit and his signature song, "Piano Man" peaked at #25 on the Billboard Hot 100 chart in April 1974. Following Joel's breakthrough as a popular musician with the release of The Stranger, it became one of his most well-known songs. It is now a highlight of Joel's live shows, where he usually allows the audience to sing the chorus. In 2015, the Library of Congress selected "Piano Man" for preservation in the National Recording Registry for its "cultural, historic, or artistic significance".

Overview

Song background
"Piano Man" is a fictionalized retelling of Joel's own experience as a piano-lounge singer for six months in 1972–73 at the now defunct Executive Room bar in the Wilshire district of Los Angeles. In a talk on Inside the Actors Studio, Joel said that he had to get away from New York due to a conflict with his then recording company and hence lived in Los Angeles for three years with his first wife. Since he needed work to pay the bills, but could not use his better known name, he worked at the Executive Room bar as a piano player using the name "Bill Martin" (Joel's full name is William Martin Joel).

Joel has stated that all of the characters depicted in the song were based on real people. "John at the bar" was really the bartender who worked during Joel's shift at the piano bar. "Paul is a real estate novelist" refers to a real estate agent named Paul who would sit at the bar each night working on what he believed would be the next great American novel. "The waitress is practicing politics" refers to Joel's first wife Elizabeth Weber, with whom he moved to Los Angeles from New York in 1972 and who worked at The Executive Room as a waitress while Joel played the piano. Joel had moved from New York to L.A. to record his first album, Cold Spring Harbor, which was marred by a mastering error by the album's producers at Family Productions, the first label that signed Joel. After this bad experience, Joel wanted to leave his contract with Family Productions for Columbia Records, but the contract that he had signed made this very difficult. So Joel stated that he was "hiding out" at the bar, performing under the name Bill Martin, while lawyers at Columbia Records tried to get him out of his first record deal.

Content 
The verses of the song are sung from the point of view of a bar piano player who focuses mainly on the "regular crowd" that "shuffles" into the bar at nine o'clock on a Saturday: an old man, John the bartender, the waitress, businessmen, and bar regulars like "real estate novelist" Paul and navy sailor Davy. Most of these characters have broken or unfulfilled dreams, and the pianist's job is to help them "forget about life for a while", as the lyrics state. The pianist makes money when the patrons "sit at the bar, and put bread in my jar, and say, 'Man, what are you doin' here?'" The chorus, in bar-room sing-along style, comes from the bar patrons themselves, who say, "Sing us a song, / You're the piano man; / Sing us a song tonight. / Well, we're all in the mood for a melody, / And you've got us feeling all right." As for the lyrics, Joel has observed that with their five-line grouping, they were more in the form of a limerick than a typical poem.

Reception
Cash Box said that the "soft, tender narrative tune, reminiscent of that material being spun by Harry Chapin, is going to attract a ton of folks looking to sink their teeth into an equal blend of music and lyric".

Releases 
It was first released as a single on November 2, 1973, and then as the second track on Joel's Piano Man album and was later released on several greatest hits collections.

When originally issued as a single, the song was deemed too long (at 5:37) by Columbia Records executives. Two verses were cut in half and spliced together for the release (at 4:33). A promo 45 contained an even shorter edit (at 3:16), which also removed the 4th verse and final chorus. These single edits were remixed bringing out the acoustic guitars and harmonicas. Joel's followup "The Entertainer" refers to the editing of it by commenting: "It was a beautiful song, but it ran too long. / If you're gonna have a hit, you gotta make it fit. / So they cut it down to 3:05."

Composition 
Joel wrote and originally performed the song in the key of C major. It has a  waltz time signature and begins with a jazzy piano solo before moving into its piano and harmonica introduction. The verses and the chorus feature a descending walking bassline in C that ends with a D–G turnaround. Instrumentally, Joel's 1973 version features piano, harmonica, bass guitar, acoustic guitar, accordion, mandolin, and drums.

Joel regretted the fact that the verses and the chorus of the song both use the same chord sequence and a similar melody, stating that the melody "doesn't go anywhere [musically]". Nevertheless, Joel also included minor harmonic variation and a different melody in the song's bridge section.

Track listing

7" US single (1973) 
 "Piano Man" – 4:30
 "You're My Home" – 3:08

Music video
The first music video for this song was released in 1973. It features Joel portraying Bill Martin, a bar act performing the song, and shows a typical American bar as a setting. A new version of the video was shot in 1985, with new extras, and a much more crowded and upbeat bar scene. The original video used an alternate take of the song but it was at the same length as the album version, while the new video used said album version.

Popularity 
The single broke into the Billboard Top 40 in April 1974 at #30, going on to ultimately peak at #25, making it Joel's first top 40 hit. In Canada, the song peaked at #10, and established Joel as a star there.

Initially, "Piano Man" was a moderate hit in the US. However, following the 1977 release of Joel's album The Stranger, the song became one of his best-known and best-loved songs.

During the first Face to Face tour featuring Elton John and Joel, ads promoted the event as "Rocket Man meets Piano Man".

"Piano Man" was ranked #421 in the 2004 list of Rolling Stones 500 Greatest Songs of All Time. Ultimate Classic Rock placed it at #63 in its "Top 100 Classic Rock Songs" list.

"Piano Man" was selected as one of 25 sound recordings in 2015 to be preserved by the Library of Congress National Recording Registry for being "culturally, historically, or aesthetically significant".

Charts

Weekly charts

Year-end charts

Certifications

References

External links 
  / ⒞1985 Sony BMG channel

1970s ballads
1973 debut singles
Billy Joel songs
Songs based on actual events
Songs about alcohol
Songs about music
Songs about pianos
Songs about musicians
Songs written by Billy Joel
Song recordings produced by Michael Stewart (musician)
Columbia Records singles
1973 songs
United States National Recording Registry recordings